Choe Yu-ri (born 16 September 1994) is a South Korean footballer who plays as a forward for WK League club Hyundai Steel Red Angels and the South Korea women's national team.

Career statistics

International 

Scores and results list South Korea's goal tally first, score column indicates score after each Choe goal.

References

1994 births
Living people
South Korean women's footballers
Women's association football forwards
South Korea women's under-20 international footballers
South Korea women's international footballers
Asian Games bronze medalists for South Korea
Asian Games medalists in football
Footballers at the 2014 Asian Games
Footballers at the 2018 Asian Games
Medalists at the 2014 Asian Games
Medalists at the 2018 Asian Games
WK League players
Incheon Hyundai Steel Red Angels WFC players